István Kühár (August 28, 1887 – January 1, 1922) was a Slovene Roman Catholic priest, politician, and writer in Hungary, and later in Yugoslavia.

He was born in Gradišče, near Tišina, to József Kühár and Katalin Gombócz. His mother was a daughter of a petty nobleman. His brother János Kühar was also a writer that promoted Prekmurje Slovene. Between 1917 and 1922, he was the parish priest in Beltinci.

Politically, Kühar favored the secession of the Hungarian Slovenes from Hungary and their autonomy in Slovenia. Kühar, József Klekl, József Szakovics, József Csárics, and Iván Bassa advocated autonomy for Prekmurje in 1918 and 1919. After World War I, Kühar identified with Prekmurje Slovene in Yugoslavia. Kühar was an editor of the Catholic newspaper Marijin list.

Sources
 Források a Muravidék Történetéhez (Viri za zgodovino Prekmurja) 2. Szombathely-Zalaegerszeg 2008. 
 Vasi digitális könyvtár – Vasi egyházmegye

See also
 Slovene March (Kingdom of Hungary)
 List of Slovene writers and poets in Hungary

1887 births
1922 deaths
People from the Municipality of Tišina
Hungarian Slovenes
20th-century Slovenian Roman Catholic priests
Slovenian politicians
Slovenian writers and poets in Hungary